Amy Wynn Pastor (born May 9, 1976) is best known as a carpenter on the TLC reality shows Trading Spaces and Trading Spaces: Family Edition.  In 2007, She starred in Backyard Stadiums, hosted by Michael Strahan.  She is the spokesperson for Carpet One Floor & Home, as well as a line of women's safety equipment produced by AOSafety.

Pastor is the younger daughter of a professional trombone player, Brian Pastor, and a teacher, Barbara Pastor, and grew up in a Conservative Jewish family in Philadelphia. She was in several television commercials as a child and majored in theater at Pennsylvania State University, graduating in 1999. While at university she found that she preferred carpentry and set design to acting. In 2000 she won the role of a carpenter on TLC's new reality show, Trading Spaces, allowing her to combine both acting and carpentry.

When she is not on the road, she splits her time between her home in the Philadelphia suburbs and in Denver, Colorado.  Some of her hobbies are folklore, crafts, and yoga. She also proved herself to be an able poker player in a match between cast members from Trading Spaces and American Chopper on the World Poker Tour by reaching the final table. In addition to her work on television, she has published a book on carpentry, Yes, You Can!: Home Repairs Made Easy, with Ken Sidey (2005, Meredith Books)

References

External links
 
 American Chopper vs. Trading Spaces on the World Poker Tour

1976 births
Living people
People from Philadelphia
20th-century American Jews
American carpenters
Penn State College of Arts and Architecture alumni
Participants in American reality television series
Women carpenters
21st-century American Jews